Servílio Conti, I.M.C. (October 19, 1916 – September 14, 2014) was an Italian prelate of the Roman Catholic Church. At the time of his death was one of the oldest Roman Catholic bishops and one of the oldest Italian bishops.

Conti was born in Vertova, Italy and was ordained a priest of the religious order of Consolata Missionary on April 8, 1944. Conti was appointed Prelate to the Diocese of Roraima (Brazil) on January 1, 1965 and resigned May 3, 1975. Conti was appointed Titular Bishop of Thuburbo Maiu on February 8, 1968 and ordained on May 5, 1968.

External links
Catholic-Hierarchy

1916 births
2014 deaths
20th-century Roman Catholic bishops in Brazil
Participants in the Second Vatican Council
20th-century Italian titular bishops
Italian Roman Catholic bishops in South America
Clergy from the Province of Bergamo
Roman Catholic bishops of Roraima